The Auckland West by-election of 1940 was a by-election for the electorate of Auckland West held on 18 May 1940 during the 26th New Zealand Parliament. The by-election resulted from the death on 27 March 1940 of the previous member Michael Joseph Savage, the revered prime minister whose terminal illness had not been made public.

Background
The by-election was won by Peter Carr; also of the Labour Party. The other aspirants for the Labour nomination were Charles Bailey, Mary Dreaver, L. W. Holt, N. E. Herring, John Thomas Jennings, T. P. McCready, Winnifred Moore, Joe Sayegh, John Stewart and Jeremiah James Sullivan.

Because of the war, the National Party did not nominate a candidate, and four of the five candidates who stood against the Labour candidate lost their deposit. The freshly forged Democratic Labour Party (DLP) by expelled Labour rebel John A. Lee also abstained from contesting. Lee's chief lieutenant Norman Douglas was approached by the DLP to contest the by-election in an effort to boost the new party's publicity, but Douglas declined to stand.

Results
The following table gives the election results:

In 1946, Carr also died in office. Wilfred Fortune, who stood as an independent, subsequently became a National candidate (1943) and MP (1946) for the Eden electorate.

Notes

References

 
New Zealand Official Yearbook 1941 p825 
Four lose Deposits (Auckland Star, 20 May 1940 p5)

Auckland West 1940
1940 elections in New Zealand
Politics of the Auckland Region
1940s in Auckland